Fair Haven is a borough in Monmouth County, in the U.S. state of New Jersey, and part of the New York Metropolitan Area. Fair Haven is located on the Rumson peninsula along the Navesink River and is bordered by Red Bank and Little Silver to the west. As of the 2010 United States Census, the borough's population was 6,121, reflecting an increase of 184 (+3.1%) from the 5,937 counted in the 2000 Census, which had in turn increased by 667 (+12.7%) from the 5,270 counted in the 1990 Census.

Fair Haven was incorporated as a borough by an act of the New Jersey Legislature on March 28, 1912, from portions of Shrewsbury Township, subject to the results of a referendum held on April 23, 1912. Portions of the borough were exchanged with Red Bank on June 17, 1957.

History

Fair Haven's first permanent settlement dates to a structure built in 1816 at the Navesink River near today's Fair Haven Road. By the mid-19th century, steamboats stopped at "Chandler's Dock" on a route between Red Bank and New York City, bringing visitors to the area and local oysters to the city. Fisk Chapel was rebuilt in 1882 to accommodate the borough's African American population.

The steamship "Albertina" is depicted on the Borough seal. It was built in 1882 by Lawrence & Foulks.

Fair Haven has an annual Fireman's Fair during the last weekend of summer including Labor Day weekend which attracts a couple of thousand people, including noted musicians Bruce Springsteen and Bon Jovi. The Fair Haven Fireman's Fair also has a Fireman's night and invites all firefighters from any other firehouse to come and join in the festivities. The Fireman's Fair used to raffle off a car each year, but most attendees already had their own cars and the decision was made in the 1990s to switch to a 50/50 raffle whose prize can be in the tens of thousands of dollars. The fair is on the Fire Company grounds.

Geography
According to the United States Census Bureau, the borough had a total area of 2.11 square miles (5.47 km2), including 1.59 square miles (4.13 km2) of land and 0.52 square miles (1.34 km2) of water (24.55%).

The borough borders the Monmouth County communities of Little Silver, Middletown Township, Red Bank and Rumson.

Demographics

2010 Census

The Census Bureau's 2006–2010 American Community Survey showed that (in 2010 inflation-adjusted dollars) median household income was $112,308 (with a margin of error of +/− $18,209) and the median family income was $113,546 (+/− $18,045). Males had a median income of $109,643 (+/− $28,479) versus $62,083 (+/− $15,309) for females. The per capita income for the borough was $54,241 (+/− $6,162). About 0.9% of families and 2.7% of the population were below the poverty line, including 1.5% of those under age 18 and 9.6% of those age 65 or over.

2000 Census
As of the 2000 United States Census there were 5,937 people, 1,998 households, and 1,658 families residing in the borough. The population density was 3,559.3 people per square mile (1,372.6/km2). There were 2,037 housing units at an average density of 1,221.2 per square mile (471.0/km2). The racial makeup of the borough was 93.87% White, 4.09% African American, 0.03% Native American, 0.98% Asian, 0.22% from other races, and 0.81% from two or more races. Hispanic or Latino of any race were 1.33% of the population.

There were 1,998 households, out of which 47.6% had children under the age of 18 living with them, 72.1% were married couples living together, 9.3% had a female householder with no husband present, and 17.0% were non-families. 15.2% of all households were made up of individuals, and 7.3% had someone living alone who was 65 years of age or older. The average household size was 2.97 and the average family size was 3.33.

In the borough the population was spread out, with 33.0% under the age of 18, 4.0% from 18 to 24, 28.5% from 25 to 44, 24.1% from 45 to 64, and 10.3% who were 65 years of age or older. The median age was 37 years. For every 100 females, there were 94.0 males. For every 100 females age 18 and over, there were 87.9 males.

The median income for a household in the borough was $97,220, and the median income for a family was $109,760. Males had a median income of $83,657 versus $51,389 for females. The per capita income for the borough was $44,018. About 1.6% of families and 2.3% of the population were below the poverty line, including 2.1% of those under age 18 and 4.6% of those age 65 or over.

Government

Local government
Fair Haven is governed under the Borough form of New Jersey municipal government, which is used in 218 municipalities (of the 564) statewide, making it the most common form of government in New Jersey. The governing body is comprised of the Mayor and the Borough Council, with all positions elected at-large on a partisan basis as part of the November general election. A Mayor is elected directly by the voters to a four-year term of office. The Borough Council is comprised of six members elected to serve three-year terms on a staggered basis, with two seats coming up for election each year in a three-year cycle. The Borough form of government used by Fair Haven is a "weak mayor / strong council" government in which council members act as the legislative body with the mayor presiding at meetings and voting only in the event of a tie. The mayor can veto ordinances subject to an override by a two-thirds majority vote of the council. The mayor makes committee and liaison assignments for council members, and most appointments are made by the mayor with the advice and consent of the council.

, the Mayor of the Borough of Fair Haven is Republican Joshua Halpern, whose term of office ends on December 31, 2022. Members of the Fair Haven Borough Council are Meghan Chrisner-Keefe (D, 2022), Tracey Cole (R, 2024), Elizabeth M. "Betsy" Koch (R, 2024), Michael McCue (D, 2022), Laline Neff (D, 2023) and Christopher Rodriguez (D, 2023).

In February 2017, the Borough Council selected Christopher Rodriguez from a list of three candidates nominated by the Democratic municipal committee to fill the seat expiring in December 2017 that had been held by Aimee Humphreys until she resigned from office as she was moving out of the borough; Rodriguez  serve until the November 2017 general election, when he was elected to serve the two-month balance of the term and to fill a new three-year term.

Benjamin Lucarelli was chosen as mayor in February 2012 to fill the vacancy caused by the resignation of Mike Halfacre, and who left office to take a position in the New Jersey Division of Alcoholic Beverage Control, with Eric R. Jaeger in turn chosen in March 2012 to fill Lucarelli's vacancy on the Borough Council.

Fair Haven was a participating municipality in an initiative to study regionalization of their municipal police force with one or more municipalities. The borough received a grant from the New Jersey Department of Community Affairs in the amount of $40,950 along with the Boroughs of Rumson, Little Silver, Oceanport and Shrewsbury to hire professional consultants to conduct the study on their behalf. A report was prepared that proposed that on or about July 1, 2009, Fair Haven would close and move their Police, Fire and EMS dispatching over to Little Silver. After deadlines to begin this operation were missed, dispatching of police and emergency services would be handled by the Monmouth County Sheriff's office by October 1, 2009. The proposal to consolidate services with Little Silver was presented to and rejected by the voters.

Federal, state, and county representation
Fair Haven is located in the 6th Congressional District and is part of New Jersey's 13th state legislative district. 

Prior to the 2011 reapportionment following the 2010 Census, Fair Haven had been in the 12th state legislative district.

 

Monmouth County is governed by a Board of County Commissioners comprised of five members who are elected at-large to serve three year terms of office on a staggered basis, with either one or two seats up for election each year as part of the November general election. At an annual reorganization meeting held in the beginning of January, the board selects one of its members to serve as Director and another as Deputy Director. , Monmouth County's Commissioners are
Commissioner Director Thomas A. Arnone (R, Neptune City, term as commissioner and as director ends December 31, 2022), 
Commissioner Deputy Director Susan M. Kiley (R, Hazlet Township, term as commissioner ends December 31, 2024; term as deputy commissioner director ends 2022),
Lillian G. Burry (R, Colts Neck Township, 2023),
Nick DiRocco (R, Wall Township, 2022), and 
Ross F. Licitra (R, Marlboro Township, 2023). 
Constitutional officers elected on a countywide basis are
County clerk Christine Giordano Hanlon (R, 2025; Ocean Township), 
Sheriff Shaun Golden (R, 2022; Howell Township) and 
Surrogate Rosemarie D. Peters (R, 2026; Middletown Township).

Politics
As of March 23, 2011, there were a total of 4,201 registered voters in Fair Haven, of which 1,049 (25.0%) were registered as Democrats, 1,286 (30.6%) were registered as Republicans and 1,865 (44.4%) were registered as Unaffiliated. There was one voter registered to another party.

In the 2012 presidential election, Republican Mitt Romney received 53.7% of the vote (1,679 cast), ahead of Democrat Barack Obama with 45.1% (1,411 votes), and other candidates with 1.2% (37 votes), among the 3,141 ballots cast by the borough's 4,379 registered voters (14 ballots were spoiled), for a turnout of 71.7%. In the 2008 presidential election, Democrat Barack Obama received 50.5% of the vote (1,765 cast), ahead of Republican John McCain with 47.6% (1,664 votes) and other candidates with 0.9% (33 votes), among the 3,498 ballots cast by the borough's 4,343 registered voters, for a turnout of 80.5%. In the 2004 presidential election, Republican George W. Bush received 51.8% of the vote (1,765 ballots cast), outpolling Democrat John Kerry with 47.1% (1,604 votes) and other candidates with 0.6% (27 votes), among the 3,407 ballots cast by the borough's 4,184 registered voters, for a turnout percentage of 81.4.

In the 2013 gubernatorial election, Republican Chris Christie received 68.7% of the vote (1,275 cast), ahead of Democrat Barbara Buono with 29.5% (547 votes), and other candidates with 1.8% (33 votes), among the 1,873 ballots cast by the borough's 4,362 registered voters (18 ballots were spoiled), for a turnout of 42.9%. In the 2009 gubernatorial election, Republican Chris Christie received 58.8% of the vote (1,459 ballots cast), ahead of Democrat Jon Corzine with 32.9% (817 votes), Independent Chris Daggett with 7.2% (178 votes) and other candidates with 0.6% (14 votes), among the 2,480 ballots cast by the borough's 4,238 registered voters, yielding a 58.5% turnout.

Education
The Fair Haven Public Schools serves students in pre-kindergarten through eighth grade. As of the 2018–19 school year, the district, comprised of two schools, had an enrollment of 966 students and 88.1 classroom teachers (on an FTE basis), for a student–teacher ratio of 11.0:1. Schools in the district (with 2018–19 enrollment data from the National Center for Education Statistics) are 
Viola L. Sickles School with 401 students in grades Pre-K–3 and 
Knollwood School with 564 students in grades 4–8.

Students in public school for ninth through twelfth grades attend Rumson-Fair Haven Regional High School, together with students from Rumson, where the school is located. As of the 2018–19 school year, the high school had an enrollment of 983 students and 84.8 classroom teachers (on an FTE basis), for a student–teacher ratio of 11.6:1. In 2016, Newsweek ranked RFH the 144th best high school in the United States. Seats on the high school district's nine-member board of education are allocated based on the population of the constituent municipalities, with four seats assigned to Fair Haven.

Transportation

Roads and highways

No Interstate, U.S. or state highways pass through Fair Haven. County Route 10 (River Road) is the main road through the town.

Public transportation
NJ Transit provides local service on the 835 route. The nearest train station is at Red Bank, where service is available on the North Jersey Coast Line.

Notable people

People who were born in, residents of, or otherwise closely associated with Fair Haven include:
 Katie Coyle (born , author of the Vivian Apple series of young adult novels.
 Schuyler DeBree (born 1996), professional soccer player who plays as a defender for North Carolina Courage of the National Women's Soccer League
 Clinton B. Fisk (1828–1890), senior officer during the Reconstruction Era in the Bureau of Refugees, Freedmen and Abandoned Lands, who was the namesake of Fisk University
 Jacquelyn Jablonski (born 1991), fashion model
 Connor Jaeger (born 1991), Men's 1500 meter swimmer who competed at the 2012 London Olympics, and winner of the silver medal in the 1500 meter freestyle at the 2016 Rio Olympics
 Vince Lombardi (1913–1970), lived in Fair Haven while coaching with the New York Giants
 Robert W. Lucky (born 1936), engineer
 Bruce Mapes (1901–1961), figure skating pioneer who invented the flip jump and the toe loop jump
 Kevin Ryan (born 1967), president and CEO of Covenant House International
 Bonnard J. Teegarden (born 1940), astrophysicist formerly with NASA's Goddard Space Flight Center, best known for leading the team that discovered Teegarden's Star in 2003
 Charlie Volker (born 1997), bobsledder who represented the United States in the two-man bobsleigh event and in the four-man event at the 2022 Winter Olympics

References

External links

 Borough of Fair Haven official website
 Fair Haven Public Schools
 
 School Data for the Fair Haven Public Schools, National Center for Education Statistics
 Rumson-Fair Haven Regional High School
 Fair Haven Fire Department
 Fair Haven First Aid Squad
 Property, tax, and hazard data for all parcels in Fair Haven from PogoData

 
1912 establishments in New Jersey
Borough form of New Jersey government
Boroughs in Monmouth County, New Jersey
Populated places established in 1912